The 1988–89 Florida Gators men's basketball team represented the University of Florida as a member of the Southeastern Conference during the 1988–89 NCAA men's basketball season. They were coached by Norm Sloan, who was in his ninth consecutive (and final) season at the school.

The Gators were ranked in the AP preseason poll for only the second time in program history despite the loss of both starting guards from the previous season, Vernon Maxwell and Ronnie Montgomery. They were expected to be led by steady senior guard Clifford Lett and star center Dwayne Schintzius, but while Lett stepped into his new starting role with aplomb, Schintzius was suspended four games for getting involved in an altercation outside a Gainesville nightclub in which he allegedly wielded a tennis racket.

Schintzius' temporary absence contributed to a disappointing start to the season, and the Gators' record stood at 5-7 after losing their first conference game in early January. However, the team improved markedly from that low point, with the turnaround beginning during a key conference road game at Vanderbilt. Florida committed a turnover with one second remaining while trailing 72-70, seemingly sealing a loss. However, before play resumed, several tennis balls were tossed onto the court from the stands, apparently in taunting reference to Schinztius's earlier altercation. The officials called a technical foul on the home team, and Schintzius hit the resulting two free throws to send the game into overtime. He then scored Florida's first seven points in the extra period to lead the Gators to an 81-78 win. The improbable win was the second victory in what grew into an 11-game conference streak that ran from mid-January until early March.

The Gators ended the season one game ahead of Vanderbilt and Alabama in the conference standings to earn the program's first ever regular season SEC basketball championship. They were the runners-up to Alabama in the SEC tournament and received their third consecutive at-large bid to the NCAA tournament as a #7 seed. However, a poor shooting performance led to an upset loss to Colorado State in the first round, ending the Gators' season.

Florida was again ranked in the AP preseason poll leading up to the following season, but days before the first game in November 1989, Sloan was forced to resign due to an NCAA investigation into the program. Dwayne Schintzius quit the team over conflicts with interim coach Don DeVoe, and the program's streak of consecutive NCAA tournament appearances ended in 1989-90 with their first losing record in six years.

Roster

Schedule and results

|-
!colspan=9 style=| Regular season

|-
!colspan=9 style=| SEC tournament

|-
!colspan=9 style=| NCAA tournament

References

Florida Gators men's basketball seasons
Florida
Florida
Florida Gators
Florida Gators